Charitraheen (lit. Characterless) is a 1975 Bangladeshi film directed by Baby Islam. It stars Meena Kumari and Prabir Mitra. It garnered Bangladesh National Film Awards in two categories: Best Music Direction and Best Cinematographer.

Cast 
 Minna Khan
 Probir Mitra

Awards 
Bangladesh National Film Awards
Best Music Director - Debu Bhattacharya and Lokman Hossain Fakir (joint)
Best Cinematographer - Baby Islam

References

1975 films
Bengali-language Bangladeshi films
Films scored by Debu Bhattacharya
Films scored by Lokman Hossain Fakir

1970s Bengali-language films